Moyvoughly (historically Moyvaghly, from ) is a small village in the countryside of County Westmeath. It is about 5 km north of the town of Moate.

The village has a post office and old school.

See also 
 List of towns and villages in Ireland

References

Towns and villages in County Westmeath